Crimplesham is a village and civil parish in the English county of Norfolk.

History
Crimplesham's name is of Anglo-Saxon origin and derives from the Old English for Crymple's homestead or farmstead.

In the Domesday Book, Crimplesham is recorded as a settlement of 28 households in the hundred of Clackclose. In 1086, the village formed part of the estate of Reginald, son of Ivo. Additionally, the Domesday Book tells us that the landowner of Crimplesham in 1066 was Aelgyth, a woman.

During the Nineteenth Century, Crimplesham Manor was owned by the Bagges, with Crimplesham Hall being remodelled in the 1880s by Alfred Waterhouse at the expense of John Grant Morris. Crimplesham Hall stills stands today and is Grade II listed. Furthermore, Crimplesham was a centre for Abolitionist Movement with records showing how Elizabeth Doyle of Crimplesham Hall inviting freed slaves to Crimplesham to meet the local schoolchildren.

Geography
According to the 2011 Census, Crimplesham has a population of 298 residents living in 145 households.

Crimplesham falls within the constituency of South West Norfolk and is represented at Parliament by Liz Truss MP of the Conservative Party.

St. Mary's Church
Crimplesham's parish church is of Norman origin and is dedicated to Saint Mary. St. Mary's was heavily remodelled in the Fifteenth and Nineteenth Centuries, with a new chancel being installed in the 1860s.

Notable Residents
Francis Dereham- Tudor courtier, executed in 1541 on the orders of King Henry VIII

War Memorial
Crimplesham's war memorial takes the form of a framed paper plaque listing the following names of the fallen for the First World War:
 Private Walter Bowman (1895-1915), 1st Battalion, Hampshire Regiment
 Private Frank Wade (d.1915), 7th Battalion, Royal Norfolk Regiment
 Private Harry Sayers (1873-1919), 1/5th Battalion, Somerset Light Infantry
 Frederick Wade

Crimplesham does not have a memorial for the fallen of the parish from the Second World War, however, the following men are recorded to have fought and died in the conflict:
 Pilot-Officer Anthony M. Dillon (1922-1940), No. 229 Squadron RAF
 Aircraftman-First Class Francis C. Reeves (1912-1940), No. 907 (Balloon) Squadron RAF
 Private Kenneth D. Bland (1920-1942), 4th Battalion, Royal Norfolk Regiment

Crimplesham also has a memorial bench dedicated to the fallen of the First World War.

References

External links

Villages in Norfolk
King's Lynn and West Norfolk
Civil parishes in Norfolk